David Lewis, S.J. (1616 – 27 August 1679) was a Jesuit Catholic priest and martyr who was also known as Charles Baker. Lewis was canonized by Pope Paul VI in 1970 as one of the Forty Martyrs of England and Wales and is venerated as a saint in the Catholic Church. His feast day is celebrated on 27 August.

Early life 
Lewis, the youngest of nine children of Anglican Reverend Morgan Lewis, the headmaster of a grammar school, and Margaret Pritchard, a Catholic, was born at Abergavenny, Monmouthshire, in 1616. His cousin was another future martyr – John Kemble.

At 16 years of age, while visiting Paris, he converted to Catholicism from Anglicanism and subsequently went to study at the English College, Rome, where he assumed the alias "Charles Baker", a common practice among Catholic priests to avoid spies and informers in the employ of the Crown. He was ordained a Catholic priest on 20 July 1642. Three years later, he joined the Society of Jesus. 

He returned to his native land  for a year. Then he was appointed spiritual director to the seminarians at the English College in Rome. After his mission in Rome had been completed, he came back to Monmouthshire and worked for 30 years in the apostolate paying much attention to the poor people and people in need. Due to this, he was known as Tad y Tlodion ("Father of the Poor").

Arrest and execution 

He was arrested on 17 November 1678 at St Michael's Church, Llantarnam, then in Monmouthshire, and condemned at the Assizes in Monmouth in March 1679 as a Catholic priest and for saying Catholic Masses. He was accused of attempting to kill Charles II and trying to restore the Catholic faith in Wales. He was betrayed by an apostate couple who had been promised an award of 50 pounds for the Jesuit's capture, and another sum of 200 pounds was promised by a Welsh magistrate to those who could help in his exposure. Like John Wall and John Kemble, he was then sent to London to be examined by Titus Oates (the originator of the Popish Plot) and other informers.

He was brought for trial at the Lenten Assizes in Monmouth on 16 March 1679, on a charge of high treason – for having become a Catholic priest and then remaining in England, contrary to the Jesuits, etc. Act 1584.

He pled not guilty to the charge of being an accessory to the Popish Plot. However, five or six witnesses claimed they had seen him say Mass and perform other priestly duties. For this, Lewis was found guilty and sentenced to death by Sir Robert Atkyns. The condemned priest was brought to Newgate Prison in London with John Kemble (Herefordshire) and questioned about the "plot". Oates and his fellow informers  William Bedloe, Stephen Dugdale and  Miles Prance  were unable to prove anything against him. Lord Shaftesbury advised him that if he gave evidence about the "plot" or renounced his Catholic faith, his life would be spared and he would be greatly rewarded. Lewis said in his dying speech, "discover the plot I could not, as I knew of none; and conform I would not, for it was against my conscience". His last words before execution were:

He was brought back to Usk in Monmouthshire for his execution by John Arnold of Monmouthshire, prayed at the Gunter Mansion and was hanged on 27 August 1679 and then posthumously disemboweled. It was a tribute to the esteem in which he was held that the crowd, mainly Protestants, insisted that he be allowed to hang until he was dead and receive a proper burial. The Sheriff, who knew and liked Lewis, refused to attend the execution, which he had postponed for as long as he could.

After the Titus Oates affair (1679–80), the remaining Welsh-speaking Catholic clergy were either executed or exiled. Lewis was the last Welshman to become a Jesuit until 2001, more than 300 years later.

Recognition
Together with John Wall, John Kemble and 37 other martyrs, David Lewis was canonized by Pope Paul VI in 1970 – the Forty Martyrs of England and Wales. In November 2007, a plaque was erected on the spot where Lewis was arrested near Llantarnam Abbey. The Catholic church in Usk is St David Lewis and St Francis Xavier Church.

Citations

References
Herbermann, Charles, ed (1913). "Ven. Charles Baker". Catholic Encyclopedia. Robert Appleton Company.

Attribution

Jesuit saints
1616 births
1679 deaths
Converts to Roman Catholicism from Anglicanism
Welsh Roman Catholics
Forty Martyrs of England and Wales
People executed by Stuart England by hanging, drawing and quartering
Victims of the Popish Plot
17th-century Christian saints
17th-century Roman Catholic martyrs
People from Abergavenny
Executed Welsh people
17th-century Welsh Jesuits
Jesuit martyrs